The SS Gainesville Victory was the 22nd Victory ship built during World War II under the Emergency Shipbuilding program. She was launched by the California Shipbuilding Company on June 9, 1944, and completed on July 22, 1944. The ship’s United States Maritime Commission designation was VC2-S-AP3, hull number 22 (V-22). She was operated by the Seas Shipping Company.  SS Gainesville Victory served in the Pacific Ocean during World War II. SS Gainesville Victory was number one of the new 10,500-ton class of ships, known as Victory ships.  Victory ships were designed to replace the earlier Liberty Ships. Liberty ships were designed to be used just for WW2, while Victory ships were designed to last longer and serve the US Navy after the war. The Victory ships differed from the Liberty ships in that they were faster, longer, wider, taller, had a thinner stack set farther toward the superstructure, and had a long raised forecastle.

SS Gainesville Victory was christened by Mrs. Margaret Mansuy of Long Beach, California, the wife of Calshlp's acting comptroller, Frank Mansuy.

World War II
Gainesville Victory steamed into the Pacific to bring supplies to the Pacific War troops. She took supplies for the Liberation of The Philippines and the Battle of Leyte from April 1 until April 6, 1945.

War Relief and Seacowboys

From 1945 to 1947 the United Nations Relief and Rehabilitation Administration and the Brethren Service Committee of the Church of the Brethren sent livestock to war-torn countries.
In 1942, the Church of the Brethren started a program called, Heifers for Relief project, which in 1953 became Heifer International. The SS Gainesville Victory was one of the ships, known as a cowboy ships, as she moved livestock across the Atlantic Ocean. The Gainesville Victory moved horses, heifers, mules, chicks, rabbits, and goats. In February 1946, she arrived in Germany with livestock. This relief effort was also part of the Marshall Plan. She made three relief trips to Poland in 1946 and one trip to Czechoslovakia.

After the war and war relief in 1948, the Gainesville Victory was laid up in Beaumont, Texas, in the National Defense Reserve Fleet. A new war was starting in the Far East so she was then removed from the Reserve Fleet.

Korean War
SS Gainesville  Victory served as merchant marine ship supplying goods for the Korean War. About 75 percent of the personnel taking to Korea for the Korean War came by the merchant marine ship. SS Gainesville Victory transported goods, mail, food and other supplies. About 90 percent of the cargo was moved by merchant marine naval to the war zone. SS Gainesville Victory made trips between 18 November 1950 and 23 December 1952, helping American forces engaged against Communist aggression in South Korea. Gainesville  Victory made eighteen trips to Korea. Gainesville  Victory participated in the Hungnam redeployment and took supplies to Pusan.

Vietnam War
Gainesville Victory was reactivated again as part of the buildup of naval forces for the Vietnam War. She was operated by the States Marine Line as a United States Merchant Marine ship. On August 1, 1965 the Gainesville Victory was removed from the National Defense Reserve Fleet at the James River. She was moved to the Norfolk, Virginia, and dry-docked for repair. In 1967, she was operated by the States Marine Lines.  On 1 February 1966, while returning from Vietnam, the Gainesville Victory came to the aid of a distress call northwest of the Hawaiian Islands.  The seas were stormy, and the SS Rockport, a Liberian-registry freighter, was foundering. While firing a rescue line to the Rockport, one of the Gainesville Victory crew were hurt. The USNS General Walker also came to help in the rescue. All 27 men on the Rockport were removed from the sinking ship. 

In 1994, Gainesville Victory was scrapped at Alang, India.

See also
List of Victory ships
Liberty ship
Type C1 ship
Type C2 ship
Type C3 ship

References

Sources
Sawyer, L.A. and W.H. Mitchell. Victory ships and tankers: The history of the ‘Victory’ type cargo ships and of the tankers built in the United States of America during World War II, Cornell Maritime Press, 1974, 0-87033-182-5.
United States Maritime Commission: 
Victory Cargo Ships 

Victory ships
Ships built in Los Angeles
United States Merchant Marine
1944 ships
World War II merchant ships of the United States
Cargo liners